Brian Porter may refer to:
 Brian Porter (cricketer), Australian cricketer
 Brian S. Porter, member of the Alaska House of Representatives